Janikhel District may refer to:
 Janikhel District (Paktia), Afghanistan
 Janikhel District (Paktika), Afghanistan

See also
Janikhel, a town in Bannu, Khyber Pakhtunkhwa, Pakistan